Eupompha elegans is a species of blister beetle in the family Meloidae. It is found in Central America and North America.

Subspecies
These two subspecies belong to the species Eupompha elegans:
 Eupompha elegans elegans
 Eupompha elegans perpulchra

References

Further reading

 
 

Meloidae
Articles created by Qbugbot
Beetles described in 1852